E13, E-13, E.13 or E 13 may refer to:
 HMS E13, a British submarine which saw service during World War I
 Aichi E13A, a type of Imperial Japanese Navy seaplane which saw service during World War II
 E13, a postcode district in the E postcode area
 European route E13, a road which runs through the United Kingdom
 Queen's Indian Defence, Encyclopaedia of Chess Openings code
 Tōhoku-Chūō Expressway, route E13 in Japan
 Kemuning–Shah Alam Highway, route E13 in Malaysia